L'Héritier is a surname. Notable people with the surname include:

 Jean L'Héritier ( 1480–after 1551), French composer
 Charles Louis L'Héritier de Brutelle (1746–1800), French botanist
 Samuel-François Lhéritier (1772–1829), French cavalry general under Napoleon